The Supreme Angels  was an American traditional black gospel music group from Milwaukee, Wisconsin, United States. The Supreme Angels were formed in 1953 by several young ministers. In the 1960s Reverend Howard "Slim" Hunt of Walnut Grove, Mississippi, joined the group as the  guitarist. Having been called to further their ministry, the ministers left the group to pastor various churches. Rev. Hunt decided to continue on as the now the lead singer of the group, changing the name of the group in later years to Slim & the Supreme  Angels. As personnel changes continued throughout the years,  Robert "Sugar" Hightower, of DeLand, Florida formerly of The Hightower Brothers and Mighty Clouds of Joy became the group guitarist and vocalist. The remaining group members of The Supreme Angels were Quincy King on vocals, Larry Young on vocals and keys, Michael Kimpson performing on vocals and bass, and Maurice Robinson on drums and vocals. They released seventeen albums over the span of 51 years, and the imprints they utilized were the following: Melendo Records, Nashboro Records, Black Label Records, Intersound Records, MCG Records, Gospel Jubilee, Malaco Records, and Grammercy Records. The group got three albums to place on the Billboard magazine Gospel Albums chart, and those were 1989's Death and the Beautiful Lady, 1995's Stay under the Blood, and 1996's Nobody but You.

Background
The group had its origins in the agricultural world with Reverend Howard "Slim" Hunt, an African-American, growing up as the son of cotton farmers in Walnut Grove, Mississippi. At 17 years old, Hunt moved to New Orleans, Louisiana to take a job as a riverboat steamer, while residing with his sister at the time. This lasted only six months, before he relocated to Milwaukee, Wisconsin in 1953, where he resided with another one of his sisters, while he was working as a plumber. In 1956, Hunt was working as a candy maker, when he joined a local band,  The Supreme Angels as their guitar player organized by several  local ministers, Rev. Herman Pryor, Rev. Floyd Taylor and Brother Earl Woods. As the ministers in the group were called to pastor their own churches they left the group and Reverend Hunt continue on with the group, eventually including guitarist and vocalist, Robert "Sugar" Hightower, vocalist,  Gregory Kelly, and vocalist(tenor) Patrick Atkinson Sr, Michael Boykin, vocalist and keyboards. Other Members  include vocalist and keyboardist  Quincy King, keyboardist and vocalist, Larry Young, bass guitarist and vocalist, Michael Kimpson, and drummer and vocalist, Maurice Robinson. Hunt would found the Deliverance Temple in 1986, where he was the pastor, which was located in Dillon, South Carolina and later the Deliverance Temple Church of God in Christ in Goldsboro. N.C. He continued to tour and preach until his death in Goldsboro, N.C. on February 25, 2007 after which Robert "Sugar" Hightower took over leadership of the group. Robert Lee Hightower passed away on August 24, 2010 also in Goldsboro, N.C.

History
The group released seventeen albums with various labels from 1956 until 2007, and the labels they released albums with were the following: Melendo Records, Nashboro Records, Black Label Records, Intersound Records, MCG Records, Gospel Jubilee, Malaco Records, and Grammercy Records. They got three of those albums to chart on the Billboard magazine Gospel Albums chart, and those were 1989's Death and the Beautiful Lady at No. 14, 1995's Stay under the Blood at No. 16, and 1996's Nobody but You at No. 36.

Members

 Reverend Howard "Slim" Hunt (December 13, 1934 — February 25, 2007) – vocals
 Robert "Sugar" Hightower (December 17, 1948 — August 24, 2010) – guitar, vocals
 Greg Kelly – vocals
 Daniel (Scotty) Scott - (1942-1991)
 Patrick Atkinson Sr. – vocals
 Michael Boykin – vocals and Keyboard
 Michael Kimpson – bass guitar, vocals
 Quincy King – keyboard
 William Manning – vocals
 Al Dent – guitar
 Kevin Wilson - guitar
 Kevin Cloud - bass guitar
 Joey Williams - guitar
 Bob Evans - keyboards
 Tom Eaddy
 Tommy Seymore (September 1, 1943 – April 4, 2010) – vocals
 Rev Shank Robinson  (November 11, 1939 - May 10, 2020) Lead Vocals
 JR Rideout - Tenor

Discography

References

External links
 Malaco Records profile

Musical groups established in 1956
Musical groups disestablished in 2007
1956 establishments in Wisconsin
Malaco Records artists